Liu Dan may refer to:

 Liu Dan (basketball) (born 1987), Chinese women's basketball player
 Liu Dan (volleyball) (born 1989), Chinese women's volleyball player

See also
 Lau Dan, Hong Kong actor
 Dan Liu, Canadian fashion designer